Pekka Kristian Strang (born 23 July 1977) is a Finland-Swedish actor and the artistic director of Lilla Teatern in Helsinki, 2005–2014. He grew up in Vaasa on the Finnish west coast. In 1997 he was admitted to the Theatre Academy of Finland and graduated in 2001. The same year he starred in the movie Drakarna över Helsingfors (English title: Kites over Helsinki) and in 2004 he had a role in Producing Adults. Strang plays the titular character in the 2017 Dome Karukoski film Tom of Finland.

Strang is the Swedish actor of The Hemulen in the Finnish-British animated television family drama Moominvalley (2019–).

In 2021 Strang played main role in video to Beast in Black song "Moonlight Rendezvous".

References

External links 

1977 births
Finnish male actors
Living people